Chris Anokute is an A&R executive and Founder of the entertainment company, Young Forever Inc. He was born from Nigerian parents, grew up in New Jersey, and currently resides in Los Angeles, California. His first stint in A&R was when he was hired at Virgin/Capitol Records in 2006 as their Senior Director of A&R at the age of 23 years old. While at Virgin/Capitol Records, Chris oversaw the A&R for Katy Perry and Joss Stone. He later held senior vice-president of A&R roles at Universal Motown Records, Island Def Jam Music Group and Epic Records between the years of 2011 and 2018.

Career
Anokute's entry point into the music industry came when at the age of 17, he approached John Houston, father of Whitney, and asked to be part of his management team. Houston soon became a mentor to Anokute.

At the same time he secured an internship in A&R administration at Def Jam Records, working under A&R executive Rob Mitchell. Once promoted to A&R Administration assistant, he worked on projects including Sum 41, Ashanti, Foxy Brown and Jay-Z's The Blueprint.

Anokute discovered the songwriter Alisha Brooks, and later introduced her to Vada Nobles. Nobles provided a selection of instrumentals to write to, and from one track, Brooks created Pon de Replay. Soon afterwards, the song was recorded by the then unknown Rihanna. Pon De Replay landed the 16-year-old a deal with Def Jam Universal, becoming her debut single as a major label recording artist.

Anokute was soon hired by Jason Flom as the senior director A&R for Virgin/Capitol Records, where his first A&R work project was Joss Stone's Introducing Joss Stone (stylised as Introducing... Joss Stone) (2007). Shortly after, Chris and Jason signed Katy Perry through an introduction from Katy's long time publicist, Angelica Cob-Baehler. He went on to successfully A&R Katy's first two multi-platinum Capitol albums, One Of The Boys (2008) and Teenage Dream (2010), yielding 11 #1 singles and over 50 million albums and singles sold collectively. As an independent hire, Chris also worked A&R on Katy's Smile album (2020), that achieved RIAA gold status, and featured the RIAA platinum, 1 billion plus streaming hit, Never Really Over. 

In 2011, Anokute left Capitol to take a job at Universal Motown as their senior vice president, A&R. There, he worked closely with Motown President Sylvia Rhone, assisting her on Kelly Rowland's first album for the label, Here I Am, which included the #1 single Motivation (featuring Lil’ Wayne).

In 2012, Chris made a lateral move to Island Def Jam Music Group, where he served as the company's senior vice-president of A&R. While at Island Def Jam Music Group, Chris signed Australian rapper Iggy Azalea, and worked A&R on her debut album The New Classic. The album featured the 3 multi-platinum singles: Work, Fancy, and Black Widow.

In 2014, Chris launched the entertainment firm, Young Forever Inc. Young Forever is an artist development production company specializing in recording, artist management and A&R. Young Forever's first management/artist development signing was a fairly unknown Bebe Rexha. Young Forever helped develop her initial demos, and later negotiated her major recording and publishing deals with Warner Bros. Records and BMG Music Publishing. They saw some early success together with Bebe's songwriting and vocal collaborations on breakthrough hits such as: "The Monster", by Eminem & Rihanna, "Hey Mama" w/ David Guetta & Nicki Minaj, and "Me, Myself and I" w/ G-Eazy. Young Forever Inc. and Bebe ended their business relationship in early 2016. In that same year, Chris was hired as the SVP of A&R for Epic Records after consulting them for a year. At Epic, Chris handled A&R on Fifth Harmony's breakthrough album 7/27 , which delivered their biggest hit to date, "Work from Home" featuring Ty Dolla Sign (5× platinum). He also oversaw A&R on their 3rd studio album, Fifth Harmony. In addition to Fifth Harmony, Chris handled A&R on Swedish pop singer Zara Larsson's debut album, So Good, which was the first debut album from a female to reach one billion streams on Spotify.

In 2019, Chris decided to run the Young Forever business full time moving forward. That same year, he also served as an Executive Producer for American Idol.

Chris has been featured in Billboard Magazine's A&R power list, and as "Billboard's 30 under 30" and "40 under 40" honors

References

External links

A&R people
Year of birth missing (living people)
Living people
American people of Nigerian descent
Place of birth missing (living people)
Businesspeople from New Jersey